Mattoni is a brand of mineral water, owned by Mattoni 1873 company, based in Karlovy Vary, the Czech Republic. It is the largest producer of mineral water in Central Europe.

History
The history of the Mattoni brand began in 1873 when Karlovy Vary native, originating from the Italian-Czech family Heinrich Mattoni (1830-1910) took over the mineral water production at the small spa town of Kyselka near Karlovy Vary in West Bohemia. Mattoni expanded the operations by building a modern bottling plant and establishing a distribution infrastructure to supply its product to spa guests in Kyselka and throughout   Bohemia. In the 1880s, the Mattoni brand ranked among the best known in Europe. In 1910, 10 million bottles were exported to other countries.

At present, the Mattoni brand is owned by Mattoni 1873 company, the largest producer of mineral and spring water in the Czech Republic. Since 1994, the company is owned by the Italian business family Pasquale, it is based in Karlovy Vary. The Mattoni water comes in natural (sparkling, non-sparkling and gently sparking) and flavored varieties. 

In addition to Mattoni, Aquila, Magnesia, Poděbradka, Dobrá voda, Hanácká kyselka mineral waters, the Mattoni 1873 company's portfolio also includes the Hungarian Szentkirályi Ásványvíz and Kékkúti Ásványvíz, the Austrian Waldquelle and the Swiss St. Moritz Mineralwasser. It also holds licenses for the production of the Granini fruit drinks, which are also mixed with Aquila under the Fruttimo brand, Yo syrups, Schweppes and Dr Pepper lemonades (since 2012).

Since 2018 it also owns production and distribution licenses in the Czech Republic, Hungary, Slovakia and Bulgaria for Pepsi, Mirinda, 7Up, Gatorade, Mountain Dew, Lipton, Evervess, Rockstar and Toma juices. In 2019, the Mattoni 1873 finalized the acquisition of the Serbian producer of mineral water, Knjaz Miloš.

Gallery

References

External links
 Mattoni official website

Bottled water brands
Czech drinks
PepsiCo bottlers